Kalasha Film & TV Awards is an annual accolade presented by Kenya Film Commission with a goal to recognize and celebrate achievers in Kenya's TV and film industry. Entries into the award ceremony are films and TV series that have been aired on Kenyan television stations. The inaugural awards were held in 2010 and subsequent awards are held yearly at the last quarter of the year. The Awards would represent the five original branches of the Film making: Directors, Actors, Writers, Producers and Technicians. However, the Academy organizers will advise on whether or not to include more categories as long as they sufficiently represent the entire film industry.

Nominations and voting process 
An academy, consisting of a jury of experts drawn from the industry oversees the nomination and final judging process. 30 per cent of the vote in Kalasha Awards  is decides through a public vote while the jury decides on 70 per cent of the categories including the technical ones.

The Academy members are also tasked with advising the awards organisers on how to  put out calls for entries and come up with a shortlist of nominees from the submissions received each year.

Categories

Awards

Television categories
Best TV Drama
Best TV Comedy
Best Lead Actor in TV drama
Best Lead Actress in a TV drama
Best Supporting Actor in TV drama
Best Supporting Actress in TV drama
Best Performance in TV Comedy
Best Host in TV Show
Best TV Documentary

Film categories
Best Lead Actor in a film
Best Lead Actress in a film
Best Supporting Actor in a film
Best Supporting Actress in a film
Best Documentary
Best Feature
Best Short Film
Best Director
Best Sound Designer
Best Original Score
Best Editor
Best Lighting Technician
Best Special Effects
Best Original Screen Play
Best Director of Photography
Best Production Designer
Best Local Language Film

Special accolades
Beast Feature by a student
Best Documentary by a student
Best Diaspora Production
Best Animation Production
Best Feature East

Kalasha Award for Best Lead Actress in Drama 

The Kalasha Awards for best lead actress in drama is an accolade dedicated to the best performing actress in the previous year.

References

Awards established in 2009
Kenyan film awards
2009 establishments in Kenya